Redd is an unincorporated community in Stoddard County, in the U.S. state of Missouri.

History
A post office called Redd was established in 1913, and was discontinued with that same year. The community has the name of one Mr. Redd, proprietor of a local sawmill.

References

Unincorporated communities in Stoddard County, Missouri
Unincorporated communities in Missouri
1913 establishments in Missouri